Terpsichore is a ballet in one act based on the myth of Terpsichore, with choreography by Marius Petipa and music by Cesare Pugni. First presented by the Imperial Ballet on November 15/27 (Julian/Gregorian calendar dates), 1861, for the Imperial court at the theatre of Tsarskoe Selo in St. Petersburg, Russia.

Ballets by Marius Petipa
Ballets by Cesare Pugni
1861 ballet premieres